Väinö Armas Suvivuo (born Söderström, 17 February 1917 – 2 May 1985) was a Finnish hurdler who won a bronze medal over 110 m at the 1946 European Championships. He failed to reach the final at the 1952 Summer Olympics, where he served as the Finnish flag bearer at the opening ceremony.

References

1917 births
1985 deaths
Athletes (track and field) at the 1952 Summer Olympics
Olympic athletes of Finland
Finnish male hurdlers
European Athletics Championships medalists
People from Hamina
Sportspeople from Kymenlaakso